Álvaro Galindo (born 26 February 1982), is an Argentine professional rugby union footballer. Álvaro currently plays for the French club Racing Métro 92. Standing at 6 ft 4in he plays in the back-row where he also represents his country.

References

External links
Midi Olympique profile
ESPNScrum profile

1982 births
Living people
Argentine expatriate sportspeople in France
Argentine rugby union players
Argentina international rugby union players
Sportspeople from San Miguel de Tucumán
AS Béziers Hérault players
Racing 92 players
Rugby union flankers
Rugby union number eights